The year 1888 in archaeology involved some significant events.

Explorations
Chaco Canyon is surveyed and photographed by Victor and Cosmos Mindeleff of the Bureau of American Ethnology.
Heinrich Schliemann attempts to locate the tomb of Alexander the Great in Alexandria, but is denied permission to excavate.

Excavations
 May 22 - Augustus Pitt Rivers begins excavation of Bokerly Dyke.
 Excavations of Hawara in Egypt by Flinders Petrie, finds including papyri containing parts of Homer's Iliad (the "Hawara Homer"), and the Fayum mummy portraits. 
 Excavations of Nippur sponsored by the University of Pennsylvania begin (continues through 1900).
 Excavations of the Cadmea (Καδμεία, citadel) in Thebes, Greece, by the German Archaeological Institute at Athens begin.
 Carl Humann directs new excavations in Sam'al and a trial excavation in Tralles (modern Aydın).

Finds
December 18 - Discovery of three villages by Richard Wetherill and his brother-in-law Charlie Mason while tracking stray cattle: Cliff Palace, Spruce Tree House, and Square Tower House; now  part of Mesa Verde National Park.
Llantwit Major Roman Villa.
The Mourning Athena relief is found near the Acropolis of Athens.

Publications
 American Anthropologist journal is founded.
 Archibald Sayce, The Hittites: The Story of a Forgotten Empire.

Miscellaneous
 January 13 - National Geographic Society formed in the United States.

Births
February 1 - Gertrude Caton Thompson, English archaeologist of Africa (d. 1985)
August 16 - T. E. Lawrence, British archaeologist of the Middle East, military officer, diplomat and author (d. 1935)
October 6 - Birger Nerman, Swedish archaeologist (d. 1971)

Deaths
 March 10 - Lucy Wright Mitchell, American archaeologist (b. 1845)

References

Archaeology
Archaeology by year
Archaeology
Archaeology